Dance Team is a 1932 American Pre-Code comedy film directed by Sidney Lanfield and written by Edwin J. Burke. The film stars James Dunn, Sally Eilers, Ralph Morgan, Minna Gombell, Edward Crandall and Nora Lane. The film was released on January 17, 1932, by Fox Film Corporation.

Cast 
James Dunn as Jimmy Mulligan
Sally Eilers as Poppy Kirk
Ralph Morgan as Alex Prentice
Minna Gombell as Cora Stuart
Edward Crandall as Fred Penworthy
Nora Lane as Jane Boyden
Harry Beresford as Herbert Wilson
Charles Williams as Benny Weber

References

External links 
 
 

1932 films
1930s English-language films
Fox Film films
American comedy-drama films
1932 comedy-drama films
Films directed by Sidney Lanfield
American black-and-white films
1930s American films